Martin R. Carlson (May 2, 1877 – April 7, 1971) was an American politician and businessman who served as the mayor of Moline, Illinois, from 1911 to 1918 and a member of the Illinois Senate for the 33rd district from 1919 to 1935. A Republican, he served as the President pro tempore of the Illinois Senate from 1929 to 1931 and briefly served as acting Governor in 1929.

Born to Moline native Olive M. ( Wickstrom) and Swede G. F. Oscar Carlson, he established a stationery business with his brother in Moline in 1898, and married Dr. Hada Burkhard during his second term as mayor. He had previously served on the Rock Island County Board of Supervisors, and was President of the John Ericson Republican League of Illinois. Burkhard died in 1949 and Carlson died on April 7, 1971.

References

Bibliography

External links

1877 births
1971 deaths
People from Moline, Illinois
Presidents of the Illinois Senate
Republican Party Illinois state senators
County board members in Illinois
Mayors of places in Illinois